A grand hotel is a large and luxurious hotel, especially one housed in a building with traditional architectural style. It began to flourish in the 1800s in Europe and North America.

Grand Hotel may refer to:

Hotels

Africa 
 Grande Hotel Beira, a former luxury hotel in Beira, Mozambique

Asia 
 Grand Hotel d'Angkor, Siem Reap, Cambodia
 Grand Hôtel de Pékin, one block of the Beijing Hotel, Beijing, China
 Grand Hotel (Kolkata), Kolkata, India
 Dariush Grand Hotel, Kish Island, Iran
 Grand Hotel, Qazvin, Iran
 Sapporo Grand Hotel, Sapporo, Japan
 Grand Hotel Kathmandu, Kathmandu, Nepal
 Grand Hotel (Nuwara Eliya), Sri Lanka
 Grand Hotel (Taipei), Taiwan
 Kaohsiung Grand Hotel, Kaohsiung, Taiwan
 Grand Métropole Hôtel, the original name of the Sofitel Legend Metropole Hanoi, Vietnam

Australasia 
 Grand Hotel, Childers, Queensland, Australia
 Grand Hotel, Mount Morgan, Queensland, Australia
 Hotel Windsor (Melbourne), Victoria, Australia; originally known as The Grand Hotel
 Grand Hotel (Auckland), New Zealand

Europe 
 Grand Hotel Wien, Vienna, Austria
 Grand Hotel Sofia, Bulgaria
 Grandhotel Pupp, Karlovy Vary, Czech Republic
 Grand Hotel, Birmingham, England
 Grand Brighton Hotel, England
 Grand Hotel (Leicester), England
 Grand Hotel (Scarborough), England
 Grand Hotel (Torquay), England
 Grand Hotel and Spa (York), England
 Grand Hotel Kämp, Helsinki, Finland
 InterContinental Paris Le Grand Hotel, Paris, France
 Grand Hotel Esplanade, Berlin, Germany
 Grand Hotel Villa d'Este, Cernobbio, Italy
 The Grand Hotel Rimini, Italy
 Grand Hotel des Bains, Venice, Italy
 Grand Hotel Prishtina, Kosovo
 Grand Hotel (Valletta), Malta
 Grand Hotel (Oslo), Norway
 Grand Hotel (Sopot), Poland
 Grand Hotel (Rostov-on-Don), Russia
 Grand Hotel Europe, St. Petersburg, Russia
 Hamilton Grand, St Andrews, Scotland
 Grand Hotel Kempinski High Tatras, High Tatras, Slovakia
 Grand Hotel Union, Ljubljana, Slovenia
 Grand Hotel (Lund), Sweden
 Grand Hôtel (Stockholm), Sweden
 Grand Hotel Saltsjöbaden, Sweden
 Grand Hotel Dolder, Zurich, Switzerland
 Grand Hotel Kronenhof, Pontresina, Switzerland
 Grand Hotel (Lviv), Ukraine
 Grand Hotel (Llandudno), Wales

North America 
 Canada's grand railway hotels
 The Grand Doubletree, condominium and hotel skyscraper in Miami, Florida
 Grand Hotel (Mackinac Island), Michigan, listed on the National Register of Historic Places
 Historic Grand Hotels on the Mississippi Gulf Coast, in several Mississippi locations
 Grand Hotel (Highmount, New York)
 Grand Hotel (New York City)

Entertainment and the arts
 Grand Hotel (1927 film), a German silent film
 Grand Hotel (novel), a 1929 book by Vicki Baum
 Grand Hotel (play), a 1931 play by Edward Knoblock based on the novel
 Grand Hotel (1932 film), a 1932 American film based on Baum's 1929 novel and William A. Drake's 1930 play
 Grand Hotel (musical), a 1989 Broadway musical based on the 1932 film
 Grand Hotel, long-running BBC light music radio programme (1943-1973)
 Grandhotel, a 2006 Czech film
 Gran Hotel (TV series), a 2011 Spanish drama television series
 Grand Hotel (TV series), a 2019 American drama series based on the Spanish series
 The Grand Budapest Hotel, a 2014 film starring Ralph Fiennes

Music
 Grand Hotel (album), a 1973 album by Procol Harum
 Grand Hotel (musical), a 1989 Broadway musical based on the 1932 film
 Grand Hotel (Roadstar album), a 2006 album by Roadstar
 Grand Hotel, initial name of the British band the Quick

Other uses 
 Grand Hotel Railroad Station, Highmount, New York
 FC Grand Hotel Varna, a football club based in Varna, Bulgaria

See also 
 Grand Brighton Hotel, England
 Grand Pacific Hotel (disambiguation)
 Grand Union Hotel (disambiguation)
 The Grand (disambiguation)
 Hilbert's paradox of the Grand Hotel, a mathematical paradox related to set theory and countable infinities